Oz is the given name or nickname of:

Given name:
 Oz Almog (born 1956), Israeli–Austrian artist
 Oz Blayzer (born 1992), Israeli basketball player
 Oz Ifrah (born 1982), Israeli football player
 Öz Beg Khan (1282–1341), longest-reigning khan of the Golden Horde
 Oz Peretz (born 1994), Israeli footballer
 Oz Raly (born 1987), Israeli footballer

Nickname:
 Osman Oz Bengur (born 1949), American investment banker and politician
 Robert Oz Clarke (born 1949), British wine writer
 Richard Oz Griebel (born 1949), American banker, lawyer and politician
 Osgood Oz Perkins (born 1974), American actor
 Osborne Oz Scott (born 1949), American film, television and theatre director and television producer

See also
 Ossie, a given name
 Ozzie, a given name

Lists of people by nickname
Masculine given names